Dead Horse was a thrash metal band from Houston, Texas, which was active in the 1980s and 1990s and again during the 2010s. They have also been described as death metal and crossover thrash. Dead Horse also incorporated elements of country music and Texas culture that can be heard on songs such as "Hank" from Horsecore and "Chiggers" from Feed Me.

History

Initial career (1987–1997) 
The band's first release titled Horsecore: An Unrelated Story That's Time Consuming was released independently in 1989 while a nationally distributed LP Peaceful Death and Pretty Flowers was released in 1991 through the independent record label Big Chief and distributed by Metal Blade under its parent Warner Bros. Records. Dead Horse released the self-financed EP Feed Me in 1993 which was intended as a demo for Interscope Records but failed to garner any major label interest. It was about that time that lead vocalist/guitarist Michael Haaga left the group to pursue other interests and Dead Horse replaced Haaga with Austin musician Scott Sevall (ex Force Fed) and rerecorded a new demo BOIL receiving positive review in Metal Maniacs in later 1995. Later in 1996, Dead Horse recorded the EP BOIL(ing) with Tim Gerron and released it on Beermoment Music through Sound Virus Records.

Post-breakup (1998–2010) 
Haaga went on to form The Demonseeds with drummer Joseph Fazzio and bassist Craig Cazaubon and managed one album entitled Knee Deep in Hell's Grasp released in 1999. The band was also nominated by the Houston Press in 2000 for "Best Metal/Hard Rock" but didn't manage to win their category as far as the "Readers Choice" was concerned but did manage to win the "Critics Choice" for that category.

Haaga is also credited on the first release from Superjoint Ritual titled "Use Once and Destroy" as the band's bassist and backing vocalist but his credit is buried 14 lines down below the other listed band members, just below the disc's "Photography" credit. He also went on to release a solo LP with the backing of several musicians from the Houston and Austin area entitled The Plus and Minus Show. It was released in late 2004 and it managed to garner four Houston Press Music Awards in 2005 or really five awards if you include the one awarded to Best Guitar winner Kelly Doyle that year, who in addition to playing in The Plus and Minus Show, also played in Houston Bands Three Fantastic and Clouseaux.  Haaga's first solo effort won  Album of the Year, Songwriter of the Year, Song of the Year and Local Artist of the Year. The band broke up shortly thereafter.

Ronnie Guyote also played drums in Houston based metal band nOthing which began towards the end of his tenure with Dead Horse but ended abruptly towards the end of 2005 when their vocalist/guitar player's drug addiction began to compromise the band's professionalism and integrity. It was about this time that Ronnie and nOthing bassist Mike Lucas joined up with Mike BBQ to reform Houston Industrial band Death Kultur BBQ but have only played a handful of shows since 2005 but most recently in 2014.

In 1999, Relapse Records re-released Horsecore and Peaceful Death and Pretty Flowers; all of the tracks from Death Rides a Dead Horse were bonus tracks for Horsecore while Peaceful Death and Pretty Flowers was accompanied with a track from Feed Me and tracks from their 1990 demo. Additionally, there were hidden tracks on both of the reissued CD's. On Horsecore, the hidden track was the slowed down version of French Fry immediately followed by the real-time version of French Fry. French Fry appeared on the original CD issue as track eight while apparently not on the original vinyl. On Peaceful Death and Pretty Flowers, the unnamed bonus hidden track was a collection of slowed down, spoken voices from the song Peaceful Death.

Greg, Scott, and Ronnie have since gone on to form the band Pasadena Napalm Division with D.R.I. vocalist Kurt Brecht along with nOthing bassist Mike Lucas. Shortly after, Lucas left the band and the bassist role was filled by George D. In 2013, original Dead Horse bassist Allen Price joined PND and they have moved forward with releasing their 2013 full-length LP entitled Pasadena Napalm Division on Minus Head Records.
100 beers with a zombie / zombie ray

Reunion (2011–2019) 
In 2011 the Boil(ing) era members of dead horse reunited with the addition of Mike Argo on vocals and re-released their last album BOIL(ing).  The band subsequently played reunion shows in Houston at the Warehouse Live, in Austin at FunFunFunFest, and also in Fort Worth at The Rail Club on December 2 and 3, 2011. In November 2012, Dead Horse released the DVD Making a Dead Horse LIVE, which contains live footage of the new line-up and played coinciding DVD release shows in Austin, San Antonio, Dallas and Houston.

On July 4, 2014, Dead Horse released a new CD titled Loaded Gun featuring four new songs and 10 live tracks from the "Making a Dead Horse LIVE!" DVD with the band's current lineup. Dead Horse has been actively writing and playing shows in the southern US in between stints playing as Pasadena Napalm Division with D.R.I. vocalist Kurt Brecht.

Dead Horse released their first studio album in 26 years, The Beast That Comes, on September 15, 2017.

In 2019, Dead Horse once again called it quits.

Members 
 Greg Martin – guitar, vocals
 Allen "Alpo" Price – bass, backing vocals
 Ronnie Guyote – drums, backing vocals
 Scott Sevall – guitar, vocals
 Argo – vocals

Former members 
 Michael Haaga – guitar, vocals (1987–1994)

Discography 
 Death Rides a Dead Horse (demo, 1988)
 Horsecore: An Unrelated Story That's Time Consuming (recorded in 1989, self-financed). Compact Disc: (c)  Demo 90 (p) 1992 Dead Horse DIDX 015987 (Reissue, 1999 Relapse)
 Peaceful Death and Pretty Flowers (1991, Big Chief/Metal Blade/Warner Bros.) (Reissue, 1999 Relapse)
 Feed Me EP (1994, Horsecore Publishing, DHO-3, self-financed)
 BOIL (ing) (1996, Sound Virus / Beermoment Music, DH-4)
 BOIL (ing)  (2011, Abbyss Records)
 Loaded Gun (released July 4, 2014, self-financed) CD
 The Beast That Comes (released September 15, 2017, self-financed) CD

Filmography 
 When We Ruled H-town – The story of the 90's Houston Music scene
 Making A Dead Horse Live! (released in November 2012, self-financed) DVD

References

External links 
 Dead Horse on Facebook
 Dead Horse on Metal Archives
 Dead Horse DVD News
 Dead Horse official website

Musical groups established in 1987
Musical groups disestablished in 1997
Musical groups reestablished in 2011
Musical groups disestablished in 2019
Relapse Records artists
American thrash metal musical groups
Heavy metal musical groups from Texas
Musical groups from Houston